Nayan - Jo Vekhe Unvekha ( Nayan - what she sees) is a 2022 Indian Punjabi drama television series that premiered on 3 January 2022 on Zee Punjabi. It is available on the digital platform ZEE5 before it's telecast. It is produced under the banner of Shashi Sumeet Productions and stars Ankita Saili and Manjeet Makkar in the lead roles. It is an official remake of Bengali series Trinayani.

Summary 
Nayan, a simple small town girl, experiences the boon and bane of her power of premonition. She goes on to marry Devansh under unusual circumstances and turns out to be his saviour.

Cast 
 Ankita Saili as Nayan, Neelam's sister
 Manjeet Makkar as Devansh, Rita and Rajvir's son
 Rajinder Rozy as Rita, Devansh's mother
 Yash Gulati as Rajvir, Devansh's father
 Preet as Mamta
 Chanda Gartola as Neelam, Nayan's sister
 Jagjeet Kaur as Shagun aka Shanno
 Ganesh Kapoor as Pompy
 Mohan Kambo as Girdhari Lal
 Harpreet as Madhvi
 Majhail as Nakul
 Aashok Kalra
 Sourav Jain as Wardboy

Adaptations

Ratings

References

External links 
 
 Nayan - Jo Vekhe Unvekha at ZEE5

2022 Indian television series debuts
Punjabi-language television shows
Zee Punjabi original programming